Hydrogen evolution reaction (HER) is a chemical reaction that yields H2. The conversion of protons to H2 requires reducing equivalents and usually a catalyst. In nature, HER is catalyzed by hydrogenase enzymes. Commercial electrolyzers typically employ platinum metal as the catalyst.  HER is useful for producing hydrogen gas, providing a clean-burning fuel. HER, however, can also be an unwelcome side reaction that competes with other reductions such as nitrogen fixation, or  electrochemical reduction of carbon dioxide or chrome plating.

References

Electrolysis
Energy engineering